Atlético Clube Izabelense, commonly known as Izabelense, is a Brazilian football club based in Santa Isabel do Pará, Pará state. It competed in the Série C twice.

History
The club was founded on April 26, 1924. It competed in the Série C in 1981, when it was eliminated in the Third Stage of the competition, and in 1992, when it was eliminated in the First Stage.

Stadium
Atlético Clube Izabelense plays its home games at Estádio Edílson Abreu. The stadium has a maximum capacity of 3,000 people.

References

Association football clubs established in 1924
Football clubs in Pará
1924 establishments in Brazil